Humpolec is a town in Pelhřimov District in the Vysočina Region of the Czech Republic. It has about 11,000 inhabitants.

Administrative parts

Villages of Brunka, Hněvkovice, Kletečná, Krasoňov, Lhotka, Petrovice, Plačkov, Rozkoš, Světlice, Světlický Dvůr and Vilémov are administrative parts of Humpolec.

Geography
It lies in the Křemešník Highlands. There is a significant amount of small ponds, some of them are in the urban area.

History
The first written mention of Humpolec is from 1178. In the 13th–15th centuries it was a silver mining town. Humpolec became known for drapery production from the 17th century, which reached its peak in the 19th century.

Demographics

Economy
Humpolec is traditionally an industrial town. The largest employer is Valeo Compressor Europe, a manufacturer of compressors for cars. Since 1597, the Bernard Brewery is established in the town.

Transport
The D1 motorway passes through Humpolec.

The railroad of local importance Humpolec – Havlíčkův Brod begins here.

Notable people

Jan Želivský (1380–1422), priest
Aleš Hrdlička (1869–1943), Czech-American anthropologist
Josef Stránský (1872–1936), composer and conductor of the New York Philharmonic
Anna Sychravová (1873–1925), politician
Jaroslav Augusta (1878–1970), painter
Anděla Kozáková-Jírová (1897–1986), lawyer
Jan Zábrana (1931–1984), writer and translator; lived here as a child
Ivan Martin Jirous (1944–2011), poet, underground writer and dissident
Joseph Drapell (born 1940), Czech-Canadian painter
Dusan Kadlec (1942–2018), Czech-Canadian painter
Miluše Horská (born 1959), politician
David Holoubek (born 1980), football manager
Jan Kopic (born 1990), footballer

Twin towns – sister cities

Humpolec is twinned with:
 Námestovo, Slovakia

References

External links

 
Brewery in Humpolec

Cities and towns in the Czech Republic
Populated places in Pelhřimov District